Paulli is a surname. Notable people with the surname include:

Holger Simon Paulli (1810–1891), Danish conductor and composer
Oliger Paulli (1644–1714), Danish merchant
Simon Paulli (1603–1680), Danish physician and naturalist

See also
Pauli
Paullin